The following events occurred in August 1962:

August 1, 1962 (Wednesday)
The Darul Islam rebellion in Indonesia was defeated with the capture of its leader, Sekarmadji Maridjan Kartosuwirjo, who would be executed a month later.
A Nepal Airlines RNA Douglas C-47A-DL (9N-AAH), en route from Kathmandu-Gaucher Airport to New Delhi, crashed near Tulachan Dhuri. All four crew and six passengers were killed, including Nepal's ambassador to India. Initial reports were that rescue teams had found the airliner, and that all ten people on board were safe.

An assassination attempt by a time bomb, targeting Ghana's President Kwame Nkrumah, failed when Nkrumah finished a speech early before the bomb went off. Nkrumah had stopped in the village of Kulungugu on his way back from a state visit to Upper Volta.
The 182F Skylane variant of the Cessna 182 aircraft was certified.
In the UK, the Tenbury and Bewdley Railway was closed to passengers, under the cutbacks of the Beeching Axe. 
Major League Baseball pitcher Bill Monbouquette, playing for the Boston Red Sox, pitched a no-hitter against the Chicago White Sox, one of five that year after only one had been pitched in 1961. Besides Monbouquette, no-hitters were also pitched in May (by Bo Belinsky of the Angels), two in the final week of June (June 26 by the Monbouquette's Red Sox teammate Earl Wilson and on June 30 by the Dodgers' Sandy Koufax), and a final one on August 26 by Minnesota's Jack Kralick.
Died:
Dr. Geoffrey Bacon, British scientist, 44, three days after being accidentally infected by bubonic plague at Britain's germ warfare center at Porton Down, Wiltshire.
General Gordon Bennett, 75, Australian military leader

August 2, 1962 (Thursday)
Cominco Binani Zinc Ltd. was established on the banks of the Periyar River in Kerala, India.
In order to bring an end to the Saskatchewan doctors' strike, a special session of the legislature of Saskatchewan amended the provincial Medical Care Insurance Act that had caused an unprecedented work stoppage by doctors and surgeons, adjourning after completing its work in less than 12 hours.
Lockheed presented study findings and design recommendations on the Agena D propulsion systems to representatives of Marshall, Manned Spacecraft Center, and Air Force Space Systems Division in a meeting at Houston. During July, NASA and the Air Force had tentatively decided to substitute the Agena D for the Agena B in the Gemini program. Lockheed's presentation at Houston was the final report on the analysis phase of the Gemini-Agena effort. It included Lockheed's evaluation of the designs of both the primary and secondary propulsion systems and its analysis of tests on the start system of the multiple-restart main engine recently completed by Bell Aerosystems Company, Buffalo, New York, the engine subcontractor. A pressurize-start tank system was selected in September.
North American Aviation began a test program to qualify the emergency parachute recovery system for the full-scale test vehicle in Phase II-A of the Paraglider Development Program. The first test was successful. In the second test (August 22), one of the three main parachutes was lost after deployment, but no damage resulted. In the third test (September 7), only minor damage was sustained despite the loss of two parachutes. The test series ended on November 15 when all recovery parachutes separated from the spacecraft immediately after deployment and the test vehicle was destroyed on impact. Manned Spacecraft Center decided to terminate this portion of the test program but directed McDonnell to supply North American with a boilerplate spacecraft for further tests at a later date.
Born: Brian France, American businessman, CEO of NASCAR, son of Bill France Jr.

August 3, 1962 (Friday)
The Urdu film Aulaad, Waheed Murad's directorial debut, was released in Pakistan.
Tusko collapsed five minutes after the injection and died less than two hours later.
President John F. Kennedy made the decision to break ties with singer Frank Sinatra after his brother, U.S. Attorney General Robert F. Kennedy, delivered a report to him detailing Sinatra's connections with organized crime. Sinatra, reportedly, was so enraged by the President's decision no longer to visit the singer's home in Palm Springs, California, that he took a sledgehammer and personally destroyed a landing pad built to accommodate visits by the presidential helicopter, Marine One.
At a meeting in Los Angeles, the Air Force described to Gemini Project Office its plans for converting complex 14 at Atlantic Missile Range, Cape Canaveral, Florida. Complex 14, the site of Project Mercury launches, would be modified for Project Gemini operations as the Agena target vehicle launch site. The Air Force accepted the responsibility for funding, designing, modifying, and equipping the complex to an Atlas-Agena configuration. This action was scheduled as follows: preliminary design criteria by September 1 and final design criteria by October 1, 1962. Mercury Project Office reported that complex 14 would be available for Gemini on September 1, 1963.
Died: Dean Cromwell, 82, American athletics coach, nicknamed "Maker of Champions", who coached the USC Trojans track team to 12 national championships, including nine consecutive titles from 1935 to 1943.

August 4, 1962 (Saturday)
Marilyn Monroe took the fatal overdose of Nembutal pills at her home at 12305 5th Helena Drive in Brentwood in Los Angeles, apparently at some point between a 7:15 phone call from her former stepson, Joe DiMaggio Jr., and a 7:30 pm call from actor Peter Lawford.  The pills interacted with a dosage of chloral hydrate already in her body, and she was in a coma by 10:00 pm.
Crown Prince Vong Savang of Laos married Princess Mahneelai.
Born: Roger Clemens, American baseball pitcher, in Dayton, Ohio

August 5, 1962 (Sunday)
Nelson Mandela was arrested in South Africa, and lost his freedom for more than 27 years.  After having returned home from a tour that he had made of African nations, Mandela was being driven by Cecil Williams to Johannesburg.  Their car was near the village of Cedara, outside of Howick, when a Sergeant Vorster recognized both men and pulled them over.  Mandela, who identified himself as David Motsamayi, was taken to Pietermaritzburg.  While serving part of a five-year sentence for illegally leaving the country, he was tried and convicted on new charges in 1963 for sabotage and given a life sentence.  He would not be released until February 11, 1990.  In 1994, Mandela would be elected the first black President of South Africa.

3C 273, the first identified quasar, was found by Australian astronomer John Bolton with the radio telescope at the Parkes Observatory in New South Wales.
American Nazi Party leader George Lincoln Rockwell was the guest of honor at a rally of Britain's neo-Nazi party, the National Socialist Movement, led by Colin Jordan.  Rockwell had been barred from the U.K. by order of the Home Office, but sneaked in anyway to be present at the camp in Gloucestershire.
Graham Hill won the 1962 German Grand Prix at the Nürburgring.
The Soviet Union conducted the second largest nuclear test in history, exploding a 40 megaton hydrogen bomb.
Born:  
Patrick Ewing, eleven time NBA All-Star and 1985 national college basketball player of the year, in Kingston, Jamaica 
Emmanuel Chain, French journalist and television host in Neuilly-sur-Seine.
Died: American actress Marilyn Monroe, 36, was found dead in her home from an overdose of sleeping pills and chloral hydrate.  The death was officially ruled a "probable suicide". However, the exact cause of death has been disputed.

August 6, 1962 (Monday)
Jamaica became independent. Princess Margaret of the United Kingdom and U.S. Vice-President Lyndon B. Johnson were among the dignitaries who watched the lowering of the British flag in Kingston.
The Friendship 7 spacecraft of the Mercury-Atlas 6 (MA-6) crewed orbital mission (John Glenn's flight) was placed on display at the Century 21 Exposition in Seattle, Washington. After this exhibition, the spacecraft would be presented to the National Air Museum of the Smithsonian Institution at formal presentation exercises on February 20, 1963.
Born: Stefan Sagmeister, Austrian-born graphic designer, in Bregenz
Died: Ángel Borlenghi, 58, Argentine labour leader and politician, Interior Minister and enforcer for dictator Juan Perón 1946–55

August 7, 1962 (Tuesday)

Dr. Frances Oldham Kelsey, a reviewer for the U.S. Food and Drug Administration who successfully blocked the approval of the birth-defect causing drug thalidomide for American sale, was presented the President's Award for Distinguished Federal Civilian Service by President Kennedy at the White House.
Guillermo Valencia of the Conservative Party was sworn in as the new President of Colombia, quietly succeeding Alberto Lleras Camargo of the Liberal Party in the first successful test of a unique agreement, whereby the two parties would alternate the presidency every four years.
Algeria's provisional government, led by Prime Minister Benyoucef Benkhedda, stepped aside in favor of leftist Vice-Premier Ahmed Ben Bella, who had returned to Algiers from Oran four days earlier.
Patsy Cline released her final studio album, Sentimentally Yours, seven months before her death in a plane crash

August 8, 1962 (Wednesday)
The 3rd Nippon Jamboree came to an end in Gotenba, Shizuoka Prefecture, Japan.
Mercury spacecraft 9 (redesignated 9A) was phased into the Project Orbit program in preparation for the Mercury extended range or 1-day mission.
Atlas launch vehicle 113-D was delivered to Cape Canaveral for the Mercury-Atlas 8 (MA-8) crewed orbital mission.
Elizabeth "Ma" Duncan, 58, became the last woman to be executed in the United States prior to the restoration of the death penalty in 1977. She was put to death in the gas chamber at California's San Quentin State Prison on the same day as the two men whom she had hired to murder her pregnant daughter-in-law. On November 17, 1958, Mrs. Olga Kupczyk Duncan and her unborn daughter had been beaten to death by Augustine Baldonado and Luis Moya, to whom Elizabeth had promised $8,000 which was never paid. Duncan, Baldonado and Moya
Born: Charmaine Crooks, Canadian athlete, in Mandeville, Jamaica
Died: Don Davis, 28, of injuries sustained in a sprint car race three days earlier at New Bremen, Ohio. Less than three months earlier, Davis had finished in 4th place in the 1962 Indianapolis 500.

August 9, 1962 (Thursday)
Prime Minister of Canada John Diefenbaker shuffled his cabinet, giving new jobs to six Ministers and bringing in three new men. Five of his Ministers had lost their seats in Parliament in the June 18 elections. Among the changes were the move of Finance Minister Donald Fleming to Minister of Justice and Attorney General and the removal of William Joseph Browne who left the office of Solicitor General of Canada, a position that would remain vacant for nearly a year.
Flight Control Operations Branch of Manned Spacecraft Center's Flight Operations Division outlined a program of training for Gemini flight controllers. This program included: (1) contractor in-plant training, a one-month course of instruction at McDonnell through which would cycle three classes of 10-15 persons and which would include three weeks of detailed systems training, one week of hardware training, and McDonnell drawing-standard familiarization; (2) individual training of flight controllers in systems and network operations, systems updating, and practical exercises; (3) team training, to include site training, for supporting personnel teams, command site teams, and remote site teams; and (4) network training in the control, communications, and decision-making aspects of the network flight control organization, and in detailed checkout of operational procedures, countdowns, systems tests, and network equipment. Because of experience in the earlier program, Mercury flight controllers would be assigned as flight controllers for Project Gemini, although their numbers would be augmented to meet the increased demands of the advanced program.
Died: Hermann Hesse, 85, German-born Swiss novelist known for such works as Steppenwolf and Siddhartha, and 1946 winner of the Nobel Prize in Literature

August 10, 1962 (Friday)
CIA Director John McCone provided his first memorandum to U.S. President Kennedy about surveillance that would lead to a U.S. and Soviet confrontation in the Cuban Missile Crisis, describing an increase of Soviet shipments to Cuba, and his speculation that the Soviet Union was placing offensive missiles in the Caribbean island nation, and gave three more warnings that month.
NASA announced the appointment of Dr. Robert L. Barre as Scientist for Social, Economic, and Political Studies in the Office of Plans and Program Evaluation. Dr. Barre would be responsible for developing NASA's program of understanding, interpreting, and evaluating the social, economic, and political implications of NASA's long-range plans and accomplishments.
The Herbert Hoover Presidential Library was dedicated and opened to the public in West Branch, Iowa. Hoover, who had served as the 31st president of the United States (1929–1933) was present and was celebrating his 88th birthday.
The Bell 533 research helicopter made its first flight, at Bell's Fort Worth, Texas, headquarters.
Died:
Paul David Devanandan, 61, Indian Protestant Christian theologian
Ted Husing, 60, pioneering American sportscaster

August 11, 1962 (Saturday)
Andriyan Nikolayev became the third Soviet cosmonaut, and the fifth man in space, when the Soviet Union launched Vostok 3 from Baikonur Cosmodrome. Although the Soviets maintained the practice of not announcing the launch until after it had happened, live video of a Soviet cosmonaut in orbit was broadcast for the first time.
Pyotr Bolotnikov of the Soviet Union broke his own world record for the 10,000 metres, in Moscow.
Harry Wexler, an American meteorologist who had been researching the link between depletion of stratospheric ozone and aerosol propellants, died of a heart attack while on vacation. Wexler had accepted an invitation to deliver a lecture entitled "The Climate of Earth and Its Modifications" at the University of Maryland Space Research and Technology Institute. Another twelve years would pass before the first papers about the effect of chlorofluorocarbon on the ozone layer were published. "Had Wexler lived to publish his ideas", an author would comment later, "they would certainly have been noticed and could have led to a different outcome and perhaps an earlier coordinated response to the issue of stratospheric ozone depletion."
A Mercury spacecraft reaction control system test was completed. Data compiled from this test was used to evaluate the thermal and thruster configuration of the Mercury extended range or 1-day mission spacecraft.

August 12, 1962 (Sunday)
The Soviet Union launched Vostok 4 from Baikonur Cosmodrome, with cosmonaut Pavel Popovich on board, marking the first time that two crewed spacecraft were in orbit at the same time. The two Vostok capsules came within  of one another, and the cosmonauts established ship-to-ship radio contact. Arthur C. Clarke would write later that the double launch "stunned the world", because the Soviet Union accomplishment "required synchronization of Herculean proportions at the launch site", with the second launch "at exactly the right moment to ensure the near-perfect rendezvous... only their fourth manned space flight," something well beyond the American space program at the time.

August 13, 1962 (Monday)
Renato Daguin and Giovanni Ottin made the first complete ascent of the west face of the Matterhorn. This was the last face to have been completely ascended.
On the first anniversary of the creation of the Berlin Wall, three minutes of silence were supposed to be observed at noon in West Berlin.  Instead, angry crowds began hurling stones across the border at police in East Berlin, who responded by firing a water cannon across the Wall and into the crowd.  After more stones were thrown by the Western protesters, tear gas grenades were fired from East Berlin, after which West Berlin riot police sent their own tear gas across the border.  The clash ended after an hour, and there were no serious injuries.
A thief started a fire at Mangurian Furniture in Fort Lauderdale, Florida, that completely destroyed the building and caused over $315,000 in damage, and resulted in more stringent fire codes to be implemented in the city.
Finnish actor Elis Sella married actress Seela Sella Virtanen.
The Bob James trio recorded their album, Bold Conceptions.
Jean Marie Bertrand became Administrator Superior of Wallis and Futuna.
Born:  
Leonidas Donskis, Lithuanian politician and philosopher, in Klaipėda, Lithuanian SSR (d. 2016)
John Slattery, American actor and director, in Boston
Died: Mabel Dodge Luhan, 83, American patron of the arts

August 14, 1962 (Tuesday)
In the Plymouth Mail Robbery, robbers armed with submachine guns held up a U.S. Mail truck near Plymouth, Massachusetts, and heisted its $1,500,000 cargo that had been en route to the Federal Reserve Bank in Boston. A man dressed as a police officer flagged the truck down, and two cars pulled out from side roads. The caper was financed by mobster Gennaro "Jerry" Angiulo and carried out under the direction of John "Red" Kelley. Kelley would later arrange for the murder of six of the participants in the plot, would avoid prison by becoming a witness against his fellow criminals, and, after being relocated by the federal witness protection program, would eventually die of natural causes.
For only the fifth time in its history, and for the first time in 35 years, the U.S. Senate invoked cloture, the ending of a filibuster against the Communications Satellite Act of 1962. The vote was 63-27 in favor of ending debate, three more than the two-thirds necessary. When it came up for a vote, the bill, establishing COMSAT, passed the Senate 66-11 and the House 371-10. President Kennedy would sign it into law on August 31.
North American began flight tests of the half-scale vehicle (HSTV) in Phase II-A of the Paraglider Development Program two months behind schedule. The instrumented HSTV with the paraglider predeployed was towed aloft by helicopter. Objectives of the predeployed flights were to evaluate flight performance, longitudinal and lateral control characteristics, effectiveness of control, and the flare maneuver capability of the paraglider. Despite various minor malfunctions in all five test flights (August 14, 17, 23, September 17, and October 23, 1962), test results verified the stability of the wing/vehicle combination in free flight and the adequacy of control effectiveness.
Born: Ikililou Dhoinine, President of the Comoros from 2011 to 2016, in Djoièzi
Died: Rudi Arnstadt, 35, East German border guard captain, was shot by Hans Plüschke, a 23-year-old West German border guard. Plüschke claimed to be returning fire after his patrol was shot at.

August 15, 1962 (Wednesday)
The Australian Air Force's "Red Sales" aerobatic stunt flying team was wiped out when all four of its Vampire jets crashed, killing the six airmen aboard, during formation flying near the East Sale Air Force Base.
PFC James Joseph Dresnok of the United States Army decided to defect to North Korea while stationed on the south side of the Korean Demilitarized Zone. Fifty years later, he was the only surviving American defector remaining in North Korea.
Pilot Andrian Nikolayev ejected and parachuted to earth, having set a new record of 64 orbits during nearly four days in space.
South Africa legalized the sale of beer, wine and liquor to Africans and Asians for the first time. Previously, the privilege had been limited to White people only.
The 1962 Central American and Caribbean Games opened in Kingston, Jamaica.
Representatives of the Netherlands and Indonesia signed the New York Agreement, with the Netherlands transferring administration of the Western New Guinea colony to the United Nations Trusteeship Council until May 1, 1963, after which the U.N. Temporary Executive Authority (UNTEA) and Indonesia would jointly administer the territory for a period of six years, during which the Western New Guineans were to be given a choice as to their future. In 1969, the territory would be incorporated into Indonesia.
U.S. Navy swimmers, designated for the Mercury-Atlas 8 (MA-8) crewed orbital mission recovery area, started refresher training at Pensacola, Florida. Instruction included installing the auxiliary flotation collar on a boilerplate spacecraft and briefings on assisting astronaut egress from the spacecraft.
On August 15 and 16, Manned Spacecraft Center (MSC) formally reviewed McDonnell's engineering mock-up of the Gemini spacecraft in St. Louis. The company had begun building the mock-up in January, shortly after receiving the spacecraft contract. Mock-up review had originally been scheduled for mid-July, but informal examinations by MSC representatives, including James A. Chamberlin and several astronauts, had produced some suggested changes. The review itself resulted in McDonnell's receiving 167 requests for alterations. MSC would inspect the revised mock-up in November.
A penumbral lunar eclipse took place.
Died: Lei Feng, 21, who had in 1957 been named as a "model worker" by the People's Republic of China for good citizens to emulate, and in 1960, a "model soldier" of the People's Liberation Army, "after being accidentally killed by a falling telephone pole that had been run into by a truck". He would become even more famous on March 2, 1963, when China Youth Daily would begin the "Learn from Comrade Lei Feng" campaign (Xiang Lei Feng tongzhi xuexi).

August 16, 1962 (Thursday)
The four former colonies of French India were formally transferred to Indian control with the exchange of the instruments of ratification by the French parliament of the 1954 transfer agreement. The four French territories (Pondicherry, Karaikal, Yanam and Mahé) would be merged to form the Union Territory of Puducherry.
Algeria joined the Arab League.
Beatles drummer Pete Best was fired and replaced by Ringo Starr.
The Air Force and NASA agreed to use a standard Atlas space booster for the Gemini program, sharing the development cost equally. The first standard vehicle was expected to be available in September 1963.
The Agena status displays were reviewed and eight were approved. These displays comprised seven green lights which, when on, indicated that various functions of the Agena were satisfactory. The eighth, a red light, would go on to indicate main engine malfunction. Gemini Project Office also approved the list of commands required to control certain Agena functions during rendezvous and docking maneuvers by the Gemini spacecraft. The primary mode of command transmittal was expected to be by radio. The Gemini commands to Agena were reviewed on September 13-14, resulting in a list of 34 minimum commands to be initiated from the spacecraft during the Gemini rendezvous maneuver.
Born: Steve Carell, American comedian and TV and film actor, known for The Office and The 40-Year-Old Virgin; in Concord, Massachusetts
Died: Phillip Kastel, 69, American gangster

August 17, 1962 (Friday)
Peter Fechter, 18, was killed by East German border guards as he attempted to cross the Berlin Wall into West Berlin.  Fechter's death has been described as "the most notorious incident of all" in the 27-year history of the Wall, because Fechter slowly bled to death from his bullet wounds, in front of newspaper photographers and hundreds of spectators who were unable to assist him, and East German guards who refused to approach him until he died an hour later.  In 1996, indictments would be returned against the two former guards, Rolf Friedrich and Erich Schreiber, who had shot Fechter.  They would be convicted of manslaughter on March 5, 1997, and placed on probation.
Television was first broadcast in Indonesia, at the time a nation of 97,000,000 people, as Jakarta station TVRI (Televisi Republik Indonesia) or The National Television Channel of Indonesia, began test broadcasting on Channel 5, coming directly from the Presidential Palace on the Indonesian independence day.  Regular broadcasting began on August 24, with transmission of the Asian Games.
Foy D. Kohler was confirmed by the U.S. Senate to be the new United States ambassador to the Soviet Union.
The British Royal Navy frigate  was launched at Vickers-Armstrongs (Shipbuilders) Ltd, Newcastle.  Almost twenty years later, the ship would be involved in the Falklands War.

August 18, 1962 (Saturday)
Denied the right to an abortion in her home state of Arizona and anywhere else in the United States, Sherri Finkbine received the procedure in Stockholm.  Mrs. Finkbine, host of a children's TV show in Phoenix, had been seeking to terminate her pregnancy since late July after learning that a medicine she had taken was thalidomide, which was found to cause severe birth defects, and her search for a legal abortion began the first nationwide debate in the U.S. over whether abortion should be legal.
Seventeen children from the Blessed Hope Missionary Baptist Church of Quincy, Florida, ranging in age from 5 to 14 years old, drowned along with their Sunday school teacher, when their boat capsized in Lake Talquin.  Seven of the children were from the same family.
Ringo Starr made his first appearance as a full member of the Beatles, at a Horticultural Society dance at Port Sunlight.
The 1962 European Aquatics Championships opened in Leipzig.
An experiment in publishing a "worldwide newspaper" by satellite was conducted from New York City, as seven newspaper pages were photographed, reduced in size, transmitted to the orbiting Telstar satellite, and then received at ground stations on various continents.
Norway launches its 1st sounding rocket, Ferdinand 1 from Andøya Space Center and becomes a space nation.
Born: Felipe Calderón, President of Mexico from 2006 to 2012, in Morelia, Michoacán state

August 19, 1962 (Sunday)
The Central Committee of the Communist Party of Hungary (officially, the Hungarian Socialist Workers' Party) purged itself of 24 former politicians, including former General Secretary Mátyás Rákosi and his successor, Ernő Gerő, as well as Politburo member Károly Kiss, in a move to rid the Party of Stalinists.
The first Mediterranean Grand Prix was held at the Autodromo di Pergusa, Sicily, and won by Lorenzo Bandini.

August 20, 1962 (Monday)
Fifteen people were killed in the crash of a Panair do Brasil DC-8 airliner, after it skidded off the runway while attempting to take off on Flight 121 from Rio de Janeiro to Lisbon. Another 90 were rescued, or escaped, from the flaming airliner.
The U.S. Department of Defense announced plans to develop a Titan III launch vehicle powered by both solid and liquid fuel rocket motors with a total thrust of over 11 million newtons (2.5 million Ibs). Scheduled to become operational in 1965, the Titan III would be used to launch the Air Force's X-20 Dyna-Soar crewed spacecraft, as well as heavy uncrewed military satellites. Martin Marietta Corporation had been selected as prime contractor for the project, at an estimated cost of between $500 million and $1 billion. At a news conference the following day, U.S. Defense Secretary Robert S. McNamara cited the Titan III as a major step toward overtaking the Soviet Union in various phases of military space development.

August 21, 1962 (Tuesday)
A conference was held at the Rice Hotel, Houston, Texas, on the technical aspects of the Mercury-Atlas 7 (MA-7) crewed orbital mission (Scott Carpenter's flight).
The source of the anti-cancer drug taxol (paclitaxel) was discovered by a team of botanists, led by Dr. Arthur Barclay, who collected bark from a specific type of Pacific yew tree, Taxus brevifolia Nutt, in the Gifford Pinchot National Forest. Taxol, developed from the extract of the bark, is now used in treatment of ovarian and breast cancer.
The Mexican soccer football team C.D. Guadalajara won the 1962 CONCACAF Champions' Cup, defeating the Guatemalan team C.S.D. Comunicaciones by a 6-1 aggregate over two games.
The city of Hidden Hills, California, was incorporated.
Died:
Richard Garrick, 83, Irish-born American film actor and director
Hermann Höfle, 51, Nazi war criminal, hanged himself in prison in Austria, where he had been incarcerated since January 1961, and was awaiting trial for war crimes.

August 22, 1962 (Wednesday)
An assassination attempt against French President Charles De Gaulle failed, as he, his wife, and son-in-law were near Petit Clamart, being driven in his Citroën DS from Paris to the Villacoublay Airfield.  A team of 12 OAS gunmen, led by former French Air Force Lt.Col. Jean Bastien-Thiry, attacked the limousine. The rear window and two tires of De Gaulle's car were shot out, and the President was struck by shattered glass, as ambushers fired more than 120 bullets at the automobile, but, miraculously, nobody was injured.  Bastien-Thiry was arrested on September 17, and executed by firing squad on March 11, 1963.

August 23, 1962 (Thursday)
John Lennon secretly married Cynthia Powell at Mount Pleasant Register office in Liverpool.  Lennon's fellow Beatles, Paul McCartney and George Harrison, attended the ceremony, and their manager Brian Epstein was best man.
The National Reconnaissance Office of the United States made its first successful launch of a weather satellite intended to determine cloud cover in advance of a pass by spy satellites and spy planes.
Soviet writer Valery Tarsis was punished for his anti-government novel, The Bluebottle Fly, by being forcibly committed to the Kuschenko Psychiatric Hospital with a diagnosis of "expansive paranoia".  He would not be released for six months, and would later describe the experience in his novel Ward 7.
Mohammad Ichsan and Abdul Wahab Surjoadiningrat were appointed to the Third Working Cabinet of President Sukarno in Indonesia.
Died: Hoot Gibson, 70, American western actor

August 24, 1962 (Friday)
The 1962 Asian Games opened in Jakarta, Indonesia.
TVRI or Televisi Republik Indonesia (Indonesian National Television Channel), the first national television network of Indonesia, officially debuted.
In the most dramatic attack on Cuba since the Bay of Pigs Invasion the year before, a suburb of Havana was shelled from speedboats operated by the Cuban exile terrorist group Directorio Estudiantile. Operating from a  boat, the attackers, led by Manuel Salvat, fired 60 artillery shells at buildings in Miramar, an upscale section of the Havana suburb of Playa. Nine rooms of the Icar Hostel, formerly the Hotel Rosita de Hornedo, were damaged, and 20 people were injured. The boat departed after seven minutes.

August 25, 1962 (Saturday)
Venera 2MV-1 No.1, also called Sputnik 19, was launched from the Baikonur Cosmodrome, with the aim of being the first craft to land on Venus.  However, it never succeeded in leaving low Earth orbit and re-entered the atmosphere three days later.  At the time, Soviet policy was to never announce a space mission until after it was launched, and never to announce a failed launch.
Born:  
Rajiv Kapoor, Indian actor and film-maker, in Mumbai, the son of Raj Kapoor (d. 2021)
Taslima Nasrin, Bangladeshi doctor, author and human rights activist, in Mymensingh

August 26, 1962 (Sunday)
The last major event of baseball's Negro American League was played, as the annual East-West All-Star Game took place at Municipal Stadium in Kansas City, Missouri. In the final season of the NAL, there were only four teams.  The defending NAL champions, the Kansas City Monarchs, along with members of the Birmingham Black Barons, paced the West team in a 5-2 win.
The Soviet national newspaper Pravda denounced the European Economic Community (known then as the "Common Market"), as "an imperialist agency intensifying aggressive activity against the Communist nations".
The 1962 Danish Grand Prix was won by Jack Brabham.
Died:  
Vilhjalmur Stefansson, 82, Canadian Arctic explorer and ethnologist 
Edward Turnour, 6th Earl Winterton, 79, English politician who served as a member of the House of Commons from 1904 until his retirement in 1951; during his last six years, he was unofficially the "Father of the House" as the longest serving MP in the United Kingdom.

August 27, 1962 (Monday)
At a meeting in Guangzhou between China's Prime Minister Zhou Enlai and North Vietnam's Prime Minister Pham Van Dong, the People's Republic committed to supplying the Viet Cong, at China's expense, "with enough weapons to arm 230 infantry battalions".

NASA launched the Mariner 2 space probe toward Venus, with liftoff from Florida at 1:58 am local time. As the first successful mission to another planet, Mariner 2 would reach the second planet on December 14, 1962, gathering data for 42 minutes and approaching within 21,600 miles (34,752 km). The launch came a month after the failed American launch of Mariner 1 to Venus, and three days after the Soviet launch of Sputnik 19 to Venus.
The proposed Twenty-fourth Amendment to the United States Constitution, outlawing the poll tax, was submitted to the states for ratification. The House of Representatives voted 295-86 to approve the resolution, which had passed the U.S. Senate 77-16 on March 27. By 1962, only two American states (Alabama and Mississippi) still used the poll tax to deter African-Americans from voting, and only three others (Arkansas, Texas and Virginia) had a poll tax law. The Amendment would be ratified on January 23, 1964, when South Dakota would become the 38th of 50 states to approve it.
Gemini Project Office initiated a program to coordinate and integrate work on developing Gemini rendezvous and long-duration missions. This program was handled by a mission-planning and guidance-analysis coordination group, assisted by three working panels.
Born: Sjón (Sigurjón Birgir Sigurðsson), Icelandic novelist, poet and lyricist, in Reykjavík

August 28, 1962 (Tuesday)
Felix Frankfurter, one of the nine justices of the United States Supreme Court since 1939, sent U.S. President Kennedy his letter of resignation, citing health problems. U.S. Secretary of Labor Arthur J. Goldberg was nominated to replace Frankfurter.
At a spacecraft production evaluation meeting, Gemini Project Office and McDonnell revised the projected launch date of the first Gemini flight from August to September 1963. Delays in the delivery of components from vendors caused the revision. The first crewed flight (second Gemini mission), however, was still scheduled for November 1963.
Died: Edmond Privat, 73, Swiss Esperantist, historian, academic, journalist and peace activist

August 29, 1962 (Wednesday)
Photographs by an American U-2 spyplane over Cuba first revealed the presence there of Soviet SA-2 missiles, for anti-aircraft defense.  Offensive, nuclear-armed missiles would not be discovered in Cuba until later flights, precipitating the Cuban Missile Crisis.
FC Nuremberg defeated Fortuna Düsseldorf, 2-1, in the final of the 1961–62 DFB-Pokal, the postseason tournament of the 16 highest finishing West German clubs.

August 30, 1962 (Thursday)
 An American U-2 spyplane, flying from Japan, accidentally drifted over the Soviet Union's Sakhalin Island, the only known incursion after the 1960 U-2 incident. The U.S. State Department formally apologized to the Soviet Union following a protest.
 The Supremes recorded their fourth single, "Let Me Go the Right Way", at Studio A of "Hitsville U.S.A.", the Motown Records recording studios at 2648 West Grand Boulevard in Detroit.
 Born: Alexander Litvinenko, Russian defector who was murdered by polonium-210 radiation poisoning in 2006 after publishing two books critical of the regime of Vladimir Putin; in Voronezh
 Died:  
Aaslaug Aasland, 72, Norwegian politician 

August 31, 1962 (Friday)
Trinidad and Tobago, consisting of the two southernmost islands of the West Indies, became independent after 165 years as a British colony. As midnight approached in Port of Spain on August 30, the British flag was slowly lowered as the Royal Marine Band played Taps, and after a moment of silence, the new nation's red, white and black flag was quickly run up the flagpole as the National Guard and police bands played the new national anthem, Forged from the Love of Liberty. Eric Williams served as the nation's first Prime Minister, while former governor Solomon Hochoy became Governor-General.
Gemini Project Office outlined plans for checking out the spacecraft at Cape Canaveral. Gemini preflight checkout would follow the pattern established for Mercury, a series of end-to-end functional tests to check the spacecraft and its systems completely, beginning with independent modular systems tests. The spacecraft would then be remated for a series of integrated tests culminating in a simulated flight just before it was transferred to the launch complex. To implement the checkout of the Gemini spacecraft, the Hangar S complex at Cape Canaveral would be enlarged. Major test stations would be housed at Hangar AR, an existing facility adjacent to Hangar S. The required facilities were scheduled to be completed by March 1, 1963, in time to support the checkout of Gemini spacecraft No. 1, which was due to arrive at the Cape by the end of April 1963.

References

1962
1962-08
1962-08